Seal Bay is a bay, about 1 km across, on the rugged and exposed north coast of East Falkland in the Falkland Islands of the South Atlantic Ocean.  It lies some 40 km north-west of  Stanley.

Description
The valley behind the beach holds Swan Pond, a shallow wetland separated from the bay by a sandbar.  The coastal vegetation consists of maritime heath and wet grassland overlying peat.  Except on offshore stacks there is little remaining tussac.

Important Bird Area
Seal Bay has been identified by BirdLife International as an Important Bird Area (IBA).  Birds for which the site is of conservation significance include Falkland steamer ducks, ruddy-headed geese, gentoo penguins (1500 breeding pairs), southern rockhopper penguins (15,000 pairs), Magellanic penguins, sooty shearwaters and white-bridled finches.  Imperial and rock shags are present.

References

Bays of the Falkland Islands
Important Bird Areas of the Falkland Islands
Seabird colonies
East Falkland
Penguin colonies